Great is a 2013 German short film.

External links
 

2013 films
German comedy short films
2013 short films
2010s German films
German drama short films